Diamantinasauria is an extinct clade of non-lithostrotian titanosaurian sauropod dinosaurs, known from the early Late Cretaceous (Cenomanian-Turonian) of South America and Australia. It was named by Poropat and colleagues in 2021, and contains four genera: Australotitan, Savannasaurus and Diamantinasaurus from the Winton Formation of Queensland, as well as Sarmientosaurus from the Bajo Barreal Formation of Patagonia. The existence of the clade indicates connectivity between Australia and South America via Antarctica during the Cretaceous period.

Though Diamantinasauria has been recovered consistently as a clade in the phylogenetic analyses of Poropat and colleagues, its placement within Titanosauria has fluctuated, meaning that while it appears to be relatively stable as a clade, its content and definition may change with further analysis and study.

References

Titanosaurs